Srce, ruke i lopata – Best of 2: Najveći Hitovi  is the second "best-of" compilation album and by Bosnian and former Yugoslav rock band Zabranjeno Pušenje, released in 1998. It's released through TLN-Europa.

Track listing
Source: Discogs

Personnel 
Credits adapted from the album's liner notes.

Production
 Sejo Sexon – production
 Mustafa Čengić Mujo Snažni – production
 Mahmut Paša Ferović – production
 Sven Rustempašić – production
Design
 Zenit Đozić – design, photos  
 Srđan Velimirović – design, photos

References

1998 compilation albums
1998 greatest hits albums
Zabranjeno Pušenje albums